Ivo Táborský (born 10 May 1985, in Prague) is a former Czech football midfielder who last played for České Budějovice. He is a product of the Slavia Prague youth academy.

Career
On 5 February 2014, Táborský signed a six-month contract loan deal with Azerbaijan Premier League side Inter Baku, with an option of a permanent move. Táborský made six substitute appearances for Inter Baku, and with the Inter declining to take up the opportunity to make the move permanent, Táborský went on trial with Erzgebirge Aue.

Career statistics

References

External links

1985 births
Living people
Czech footballers
Czech Republic youth international footballers
Czech Republic under-21 international footballers
Association football midfielders
Czech First League players
SK Slavia Prague players
SK Dynamo České Budějovice players
FK Mladá Boleslav players
ŠK Slovan Bratislava players
FK Teplice players
Slovak Super Liga players
Expatriate footballers in Slovakia
Footballers from Prague
Shamakhi FK players
Bohemians 1905 players
1. FK Příbram players
Czech expatriate sportspeople in Slovakia
Expatriate footballers in Azerbaijan
Czech expatriate sportspeople in Azerbaijan
Azerbaijan Premier League players